Macrostelini is a tribe in the Deltocephalinae subfamily of leafhoppers. Macrostelini contains 37 genera and over 300 species. The tribe has a cosmopolitan distribution. Some species in the genus Cicadulina are agricultural pests and transmit maize streak virus in Sub-saharan Africa.

Genera 
There are currently 37 described genera in Macrostelini:

References

External links 

 Macrostelini at bugguide.net

 
Deltocephalinae
Hemiptera tribes
Taxa named by George Willis Kirkaldy